Paul English (November 6, 1932 – February 11, 2020) was Willie Nelson's longtime drummer who started playing with him in Fort Worth in 1955, although he did not become Nelson's regular drummer until 1966. In the years in between he played with Delbert McClinton among others. In the early days, one of his duties was to serve as a strong armed collection agent for overdue payments from club owners for the band. He was the husband of second wife Janie English.

English was the titular "Paul" of the Willie Nelson album Me and Paul as well as the title track of that album.  English had a role in Nelson's movie Red Headed Stranger (1986).

English joined Willie Nelson, John Mellencamp, and Neil Young as the first members of Farm Aid’s board of directors in 1985, and he served as the organization's treasurer for many years. 

English died on February 11, 2020, of acute pneumonia, at the age of 87.

References

External links
 

1932 births
2020 deaths
American country drummers
Country musicians from Texas
Deaths from pneumonia in Texas
People from Vernon, Texas
Willie Nelson